Caulophryne is a genus of fanfins.

Species
There are currently four recognized species in this genus:
 Caulophryne bacescui Mihai-Bardan, 1982
 Caulophryne jordani Goode & T. H. Bean, 1896 (Fanfin angler)
 Caulophryne pelagica A. B. Brauer, 1902
 Caulophryne polynema Regan, 1930 (Hairy angler)

References

Caulophrynidae
Marine fish genera
Taxa named by George Brown Goode
Taxa named by Tarleton Hoffman Bean